Dookie (1933 – ?) or Rozavel Golden Eagle was a Pembroke Welsh Corgi bought in 1933 by King George VI and was the first of many Welsh Corgis to join the Royal Family. The dog was especially popular with Queen Elizabeth II, who from then on owned over thirty corgis in her lifetime.

Background
George VI (then Prince Albert, Duke of York) decided to purchase a corgi for his daughters Princesses Elizabeth and Margaret after the girls had fallen in love with the breed when visiting the corgis owned by the children of the Marquess of Bath. In July 1933 Thelma Gray of Rozavel Kennels brought three corgi puppies to the family home at 145 Piccadilly for the family to choose from. Out of the three pups, Dookie was chosen because of his slightly longer tail, the queen having remarked, "so that we can see whether he is pleased or not."

Dookie was born "Rozavel Golden Eagle" in 1933 and bred by Thelma Gray at the Rozavel Kennels in Surrey. The bright red pup was sired by Ch. Crymmych President and Ch. Golden Girl.

Royal life
After being chosen by the family, Dookie was boarded by Thelma Gray until the family had moved to Windsor, though he did spend some time at Glamis Castle. Gray and her kennel staff joked that the dog had become so "snooty" after being selected by the royal family and they began calling him "the Duke", which was shortened to "Dukie" and finally to "Dookie." The family loved the name and it eventually stuck.

Dookie became a loved member of the family and was described as "unquestionably the character of the Princesses’ delightful canine family" and "a born sentimentalist." The princesses even fed the dog by hand. He did however, have a habit of nipping at the heels of guests.

Three years later another corgi named Rozavel Lady Jane was purchased to be the companion of Dookie. However, Dookie was not interested in the other corgi and Jane was paired with Rozavel Tafferteffy. Jane produced two pups named Carol and Crackers. Crackers became a constant companion of Queen Elizabeth The Queen Mother and even retired with her to the Castle of Mey in Scotland.

See also
 Royal corgis
 Susan (dog)
 List of individual dogs
 Canadian Parliamentary Cats
 Chief Mouser to the Cabinet Office, United Kingdom
 Hermitage cats in Saint Petersburg, Russia
 Pets of Vladimir Putin
 Tibs the Great
 Cats of the President of Taiwan
 United States presidential pets
 Pets of the British Royal Family
 Pets in the United Kingdom

References

Individual dogs in politics
1933 animal births
Pets of the British Royal Family
Dogs in the United Kingdom
Individual animals in the United Kingdom